Henry Gujer (25 April 1920 – 4 November 2017) was a Swiss basketball player. He competed in the men's tournament at the 1948 Summer Olympics.

References

External links
 

1920 births
2017 deaths
Swiss men's basketball players
Olympic basketball players of Switzerland
Basketball players at the 1948 Summer Olympics
Place of birth missing